Human Performance is a quarterly peer-reviewed scientific journal covering industrial and organizational psychology as it relates to job performance. It was established in 1988, with Frank Landy (Pennsylvania State University) as its founding editor-in-chief. It is published by Taylor & Francis and the current editor-in-chief is David J. Woehr (University of North Carolina at Charlotte). According to the Journal Citation Reports, the journal has a 2016 impact factor of 1.302, ranking it 49th out of 80 journals in the category "Psychology, Applied".

References

External links

Applied psychology journals
Quarterly journals
Taylor & Francis academic journals
Publications established in 1988
English-language journals
Personnel psychology journals